El Sereno may refer to:

 El Sereno, Los Angeles, California, United States
 El Sereno Open Space Preserve, California, United States
 El Sereno (sculpture), in Mexico City
 Monte Sereno, California, United States

See also 
 Sereno (disambiguation)